Strickland Brothers Lepea is a Samoa football club located in Lepea, Samoa. It currently plays in the Samoa National League.

History
Sources indicate that the club were renamed Tunaimato Breeze for the Premier League Cup Champ of Champs 2004 competition, and competed under that name in both the 2005 Samoa National League, which they won, as well as the preliminary round of the 2006 OFC Club Championship A club under this name also competed in the 2005 season, and sources indicate that although this could have been due to voluntary relegation to make room for Tunaimato Breeze, it is suggested that it was due to a name changed with the second division team being a reserve team.

Titles
Samoa National League: 4
2002, 2003, 2004, 2005

References

Football clubs in Samoa
Tuamasaga